The Naderi Throne is a gemmed and enameled throne made during the Qajar era, now kept in the national treasury of the Central Bank of Iran. The throne has no relation to Nader Shah: the name derives from the word nader meaning "rare" or "unique" in the Persian language.

History

The throne was made by the order of Fat'h Ali Shah Qajar (1772–1834) and is seen in many paintings of his era. Unlike the platform-like Sun Throne, the Naderi Throne has the appearance of a chair.

The throne was kept in Golestan Palace but it was later transferred to the National Treasury of the  Central Bank of Iran. It was last used in the coronation ceremony of Shah Mohammad Reza Pahlavi in 1967.

Design

The throne can be taken apart into 12 separate sections. It was intended to be portable, to be carried along when the Shah traveled to his summer residences. It is made of wood, covered with gold and encrusted with jewels. Among the 26,733 jewels covering the throne, there are four very large spinels on the backrest, the largest of them weighing 65 ct. There are also four very large emeralds on the backrest, the largest of them weighing approximately 225 ct. The largest ruby on the throne is 35 ct.

The height of the throne is approximately 225 cm. It has inscribed verses attributed to Fat'h Ali Shah. Diaries written by travelers who visited Fat'h Ali Shah's court at the time also mention a throne similar to this one, though the throne may have been refurbished by Naser al-Din Shah Qajar.

The designs which can be seen on the throne include a peacock tail on the backrest, ducks, dragons, leaves and tree branches. A lion rests on the front panel of the footstool.

See also

Imperial Crown Jewels of Persia
Koh-i-noor diamond
Darya-ye Noor Diamond

References

External links
 The Imperial Jewels of Iran
Nadir Shah throne, history
Nadir Shah throne
The Peacock Throne
The Naderi Throne, later throne modeled after the Peacock Throne
The Naderi Throne
KN Diamond With the UK 

Qajar Iran
Individual thrones
Tourist attractions in Tehran
Iranian National Jewels